The ceremonial county of Oxfordshire has returned six MPs to the UK Parliament since 1983.

As a result of the local government reorganisation introduced by the Local Government Act 1972, which came into effect on 1 April 1974, the boundaries of the historic/administrative county were altered to include northern parts of the county of Berkshire. This was reflected in the following redistribution of parliamentary seats which came into effect for the 1983 general election and effectively increased the county's representation from four to six MPs.

Number of seats 
The table below shows the number of MPs representing Oxfordshire at each major redistribution of seats affecting the county.

1Prior to 1950, seats were classified as County Divisions or Parliamentary Boroughs. Since 1950, they have been classified as County or Borough Constituencies.

Timeline 
 

1Formally known as New Woodstock prior to 1885

Boundary reviews

See also 

 List of parliamentary constituencies in Oxfordshire

References 

Politics of Oxfordshire